Sergei Nikolayevich Argudyayev (11 January 1963 – 1 June 2003) was a Russian professional footballer.

Club career
He made his professional debut in the Soviet Top League in 1981 for FC Spartak Moscow. He played 4 games and scored 1 goal in the European Cup Winners' Cup 1984–85 for FC Dynamo Moscow.

Honours
 Soviet Cup winner: 1984.
 Soviet Top League runner-up: 1981, 1983.

References

1963 births
2003 deaths
People from Kimry
Soviet footballers
Ukrainian footballers
Soviet Top League players
FC Spartak Moscow players
FC Spartak Vladikavkaz players
FC Dynamo Moscow players
FC Luch Vladivostok players
FC Temp Shepetivka players
FC Podillya Khmelnytskyi players
FC Shakhtar Pavlohrad players
FC Krystal Chortkiv players
Association football forwards
Sportspeople from Tver Oblast